The Bonus Brothers is a compilation album by American rock band Zebrahead, released November 24, 2017.

Background
On October 13, 2017, Zebrahead announced the release of an album compiling of songs previously only available as bonus tracks on the Japanese editions of their studio albums Broadcast to the World (2006), Phoenix (2008), Get Nice! (2011), Call Your Friends (2013) and Walk the Plank (2015) for the following month.

Physical copies were available in limited quantities via the band's online store and as merchandise on their 2018 tour.

Track listing

References

2017 compilation albums
Zebrahead albums